Rehoboth Specialist Hospital, also known simply as Rehoboth Hospital, is a private medical facility in Rivers State, Nigeria. The hospital is situated in the residential area of D-line, Port Harcourt, roughly 2 miles (3.2 km) west of Trans Amadi. Its departments include Surgical Services, Laboratory, Pharmacy, Orthopaedics, Medicine, Obstetrics, including epidural in labour and Gynaecology. 

As of July 2013, the hospital's medical director is Prof. Aniekan Ekere.

See also
 List of hospitals in Port Harcourt

References

External links

Private hospitals in Port Harcourt
D-line, Port Harcourt
1993 establishments in Nigeria
1990s establishments in Rivers State